Crestwood is an entirely residential neighborhood located in Northwest Washington, D.C. and bordered on three sides by Rock Creek Park. Heading north from the White House on 16th Street, Crestwood is among the first neighborhoods that features single-family homes with larger lawns. It has many mature trees, and it is not uncommon to see deer and other wildlife from the park crossing the streets there. 

Crestwood has been known as part of the "Gold Coast", an enclave of neighborhoods in Washington, D.C., known as a haven for affluent African American professionals; Crestwood as the "Gold Coast", is an important part of the African American history of the District of Columbia. At times throughout its history and currently today, Crestwood has experienced demographic changes, including regarding its ethnic and racial compositions, and currently, includes more families of diverse sexual orientations. It is home to families who have lived in the neighborhood for decades, as well as younger families.

Just to the north, residents can take advantage of the Carter Barron Amphitheatre and William H.G. FitzGerald Tennis Center. The amphitheatre once hosted concerts and free cultural events during the spring and summer, and the Citi Open tennis tournament is played at the Tennis Center next door. Crestwood is centrally located on 16th Street, being about fifteen minutes by car from both the K Street business district and downtown Silver Spring, Maryland.

The closest Metro stations are Georgia Avenue-Petworth and Columbia Heights on the Green Line and Van Ness-UDC on the Red Line. Buses run regularly on 16th Street to Silver Spring to the north and government offices, downtown stores and the National Mall to the south.

References

External links
Crestwood Citizens Association
Neighborhood History (Crestwood Citizens Association) 
D.C. Government

Neighborhoods in Northwest (Washington, D.C.)